The 38th Ariel Awards ceremony, organized by the Mexican Academy of Film Arts and Sciences (AMACC) took place on July 22, 1996, in Mexico City. During the ceremony, AMACC presented the Ariel Award in 25 categories honoring films released in 1995. Sin Remitente received four awards out of 14 nominations, including Best Picture and Best Director for Carlos Carrera. La Reina de la Noche was the most awarded film with six awards; La Línea Paterna and Sobrenatural with three; Dulces Compañías, El Anzuelo and Mujeres Insumisas with two; and Entre Pancho Villa y Una Mujer Desnuda, Domingo Siete, De Tripas, Corazón, and El Abuelo Cheno y Otras Historias with one.

Winners and nominees
Winners are listed first and highlighted with boldface.

Special awards
Golden Ariel – Raúl Lavista
Special Silver Ariel – Jorge Stahl Jr. and Luis Aguilar
Salvador Toscano Medal – Emilio García Riera
Special recognition – Columba Domínguez
Honorary diploma – Cineteca Nacional, Sindicato de Trabajadores de la Industria Cinematográfica (Sección 49), and Sindicato de Trabajadores de la Producción Cinematográfica (Sección de Técnicos y Manuales)

Multiple nominations and awards

The following ten films received multiple nominations:

Films that received multiple awards:

References

Ariel Awards ceremonies
1996 film awards
1996 in Mexico